Khaled Ennasra (also spelled Nasra, Ennsra, Alnassra, Anassra, and Elnassra; 1924 – 14 July 2007) was a Palestinian poet and writer. He served as a cultural editor at the Al-Quds and An-Nahar newspapers in Jerusalem.

Ennasra was born in Jenin, Mandatory Palestine in 1924. He died on 14 July 2007, at the age of 83.

Nasra's poetry included:
Songs of the Dawn (1956)
Blaze and Scent (1960)
Hazim and Hymns (1968)
To Whom Belongs the Horses (1978)
Fog Beaches (1990)
Incandescent Lamp (1995)
Sweeter Anthems (1997)
Necklace of Glory (1998)

References

External links

 

1924 births
2007 deaths
20th-century male writers
20th-century Palestinian poets
Palestinian male poets